Antonio Concepcion Delgado  (December 21, 1917 - December 7, 1992) was an industrialist and civic leader who was appointed Philippine Ambassador to the Vatican.

Early life
Antonio Delgado was born in San Pablo, Laguna, the fourth of eight children of physician Jose Maria Delgado (the first Philippine Ambassador to the Vatican) and Felisa Concepcion.

Antonio graduated valedictorian in high school at San Beda College in 1933, and took his Bachelor of Science in Mining Engineering, magna cum laude, at the University of Santo Tomas in 1937. He saw action with the Philippine Army and as a guerrilla during World War II. He married Nellie Chuidian in 1944 and they had four children, namely Jose Roberto, Lolita, Jose Antonio, and Jose Eduardo.

On July 28, 1963, Jose Antonio died with the entire Philippine contingent to the 11th World Scout Jamboree in Marathon, Greece - 19 other Boy Scouts, 3 Scoutmasters and Chaplain - when their plane crashed in the Indian Ocean off the coast of Bombay, India. His parents set up the Jose Antonio Delgado Memorial Foundation, Inc. (a.k.a. the Ala-Ala Foundation) with the insurance money.

Business
In 1946, Delgado founded ACD, Inc., and in 1949 he established Delgado Brothers, Inc. and transformed it into the largest fully integrated transportation company in the Philippines. He founded eight other companies:
 Caltex Floating Station (CFS)
 Delgado Stevedoring (DelSteve)
 Delgado Overland Corporation (DelLand)
 Delgado Brokerage Corporation (DelBroCO)
 Delgado Air Cargo (DelAir)
 Delgado Shipyard Corporation (DelYard)
 United Services Corporation (DelTrade)
 Wood-Mosaic (Phil), Inc.
 Delgado Brothers Hotel Corporation, (DBHC) which owned the Manila Hilton (the first 5-star hotel in the Philippines and the tallest building in the country during the late 1960s into the 1970s)

In the 1950s and 1960s, Delgado became director of:
 Private Development Corporation of the Philippines (PDCP), (Because of the incorporation of PDCP, ACD had to delay his trip to Marathon Greece on July 28, 1963, thereby avoiding the ill-fated trip that took the life of his son Toton and 23 other Filipino Boy Scouts)
 Manila Electric Company (Meralco)
 First United Bank
 Philippine Radio Educational and Information Center (Radio Veritas)

In the 1960s, Delgado was elected to:
 Philippine Chamber of Industries - President
 Industrial Finance Committee - Chairman
 Chamber of Commerce - Member
 Management Association of the Philippines - President
 Philippine Council of Management - Board Governor
 American Management Association - Member

Recognitions
Delgado received awards from various organizations:
In 1954, Delgado was named Employer of the Year and in 1959 he was named Business Executive of the Year of the Business Writers Association of the Philippines.
 Silver Buffalo Award, Boy Scouts of America, 1970
 Bronze Wolf Award, World Organization of the Scout Movement, 1971, conferred at the 22nd World Scout Conference in Otaniemi, Finland
 Golden Pheasant Award, Scout Association of Japan, 1973
 Silver Tamaraw for Scouting volunteers, Boy Scouts of the Philippines
 Silver Fir Medal of Merit, Boy Scouts of Austria
 Bronze Usa and Gold Medal of Merit, Boy Scouts of the Philippines
 Presidential Gold Plaque from the President of the Philippines, for services rendered for the 10th World Scout Jamboree
 Gran Cruz de la Orden del Merito Civil, Spanish Government
 Knight Commander of the Star of St. Silvester
 Knight of the Equestrian Order of the Holy Sepulchre of Jerusalem
 Grand Cross of the Pontifical Order of Pius IX
 Grand Cross "Pro Melitense," Sovereign Military Order of Malta
 Pilgrim Medal (Jerusalem) of Pope Leo XII
 Doctorate in Canon Law and Civil Law, Honoris Causa, Pontifical Lateran University

Scouting
At fifteen, Delgado was a member of the Boy Scouts of the Philippines contingent to the 4th World Scout Jamboree in Gödöllő, Hungary in 1933; 35 years later, he became President of the Boy Scouts of the Philippines. At the 1971 World Scout Conference in Tokyo, Japan, he became the first Asian to be elected Chairman of the World Scout Committee.

The Boy Scouts of the Philippines claims that Delgado conceived the World Scout Emblem during his stint as the first Asian World Scout Committee chairman from 1971 to 1973, however the design was introduced at the 8th World Scout Jamboree in 1955, based on a 1939 earlier design by J. S. Wilson.

His son, industrialist Jose Eduardo Delgado, has been a member of the National Executive Board of the Boy Scouts of the Philippines, and is a recipient of the Silver Tamaraw Award of the Boy Scouts of the Philippines.

Faith
Delgado served as Philippine Ambassador to the Holy See from 1975 to 1982, just as his father, Jose Maria Delgado from 1957 to 1961. Delgado searched for a possible first Filipino Saint, he found a candidate martyred in Japan in the 1600s and then worked for the beatification of Lorenzo Ruiz and his companions by Pope John Paul II in Manila on February 18, 1981. It was the first time in centuries for these rites to be held outside Rome. In 1982 Delgado retired and subsequently served as Ambassador of the Sovereign Military Order of Malta to the Philippines from 1982 to 1988. He authored The Making of the First Filipino Saint in 1982, which was published in 1987. Delgado commissioned the Vatican Mosaic Studio to create an image of Saint Lorenzo Ruiz, which is now installed at the Altar of the Martyrdom of St. Peter at St. Peter's Basilica in the Vatican.

Death
Delgado died December 7, 1992, of natural causes at home in Makati, Metro Manila, fourteen days before his 75th birthday.

References

External links
French Scoutopedia article
https://web.archive.org/web/20080623072438/http://www.library.georgetown.edu/dept/speccoll/fl/f148%7D1.htm
https://web.archive.org/web/20080829164430/http://www.ops.gov.ph/europevisit07/backgrounder.htm

Recipients of the Bronze Wolf Award
World Scout Committee members
1917 births
1992 deaths
Scouting in the Philippines
Ambassadors of the Philippines to the Holy See
Filipino diplomats
People from San Pablo, Laguna
Knights of the Holy Sepulchre
University of Santo Tomas alumni